Ribes divaricatum is a species in the genus Ribes found in the forests, woodlands, and coastal scrub of western North America from British Columbia to California. The three accepted varieties have various common names which include the word "gooseberry". Other common names include coast black gooseberry, wild gooseberry, Worcesterberry, or spreading-branched gooseberry.

Description
Ribes divaricatum is a shrub sometimes reaching  in height with woody branches with one to three thick brown spines at leaf nodes. The leaves are generally palmate in shape and edged with teeth.

The inflorescence is a small cluster of hanging flowers, each with reflexed purple-tinted green sepals and smaller, white to red petals encircling long, protruding stamens. It is similar to Ribes lacustre and R. lobbii, but the former has smaller, reddish to maroon flowers and the latter has reddish flowers that resemble those of fuchsias and sticky leaves.

Taxonomy
Varieties
Ribes divaricatum var. divaricatum, or spreading gooseberry is found in Oregon, Washington, and British Columbia.
Ribes divaricatum var. parishii, called Parish's gooseberry, is found only in California.
Ribes divaricatum var. pubiflorum, known as straggly gooseberry is native to both California and Oregon.

Uses
The berries are edible and are ripe when black.

The fruit was food for a number of Native American groups of the Pacific Northwest, and other parts of the plant, especially the bark, was used for medicinal purposes.

References

External links

Jepson Manual Treatment
Calphotos Photo gallery, University of California: var. pubiflorum

divaricatum
Flora of the West Coast of the United States
Flora of British Columbia
Plants described in 1830
Bird food plants
Plants used in Native American cuisine
Plants used in traditional Native American medicine
Flora without expected TNC conservation status